Corytoplectus is a genus in the plant family Gesneriaceae. Plants from Corytoplectus are found in Bolivia, Brazil North, Colombia, Ecuador, Guyana, Mexico Southwest, Peru, Venezuela, in the cloud-forests of the high cordillera. The genus contains c. 12 species. The genus differs from the closely related Alloplectus in having an erect umbellate inflorescence and berries. The type species is C. capitatus.

Description
Corytoplectus species are herbs or shrubs ranging from 0.5–2 m tall. The stems are erect and subquadrangular, but becoming quadrangular near the top. The fruit is a translucent berry with dark striate (with parallel longitudinal ridges or lines) seeds. The leaves have dark green upper surfaces with veins which are paler. The inflorescences are mostly erect.

Etymology
They believe the name to be suitable, because, in profile, the calyces look like pleated leather pouches. However, an alternative view says that rather than deriving from the Latin , the name derives from the Greek  (helmet), giving "pleated helmet".

List of species 
 Corytoplectus capitatus (Hook.) Wiehler
 Corytoplectus congestus (Linden ex Hanst.) Wiehler
 Corytoplectus cutucuensis Wiehler
 Corytoplectus deltoideus  (C.V.Morton) Wiehler
 Corytoplectus grandifolius  (Britton ex Rusby) Rodr.-Flores & L.E.Skog
 Corytoplectus longipedunculatus  Rodr.-Flores & L.E.Skog
 Corytoplectus oaxacensis  Ram.-Roa, C.Chávez & Rodr.-Flores
 Corytoplectus purpuratus  Rodr.-Flores & L.E.Skog
 Corytoplectus riceanus  (Rusby) Wiehler
 Corytoplectus schlimii  (Planch. & Linden) Wiehler
 Corytoplectus speciosus  (Poepp.) Wiehler
 Corytoplectus zamorensis  (Linden & André) Rodr.-Flores & L.E.Skog

References

External links
 Smithsonian Institution: Checklist of Gesneriaceae. Retrieved 28 April 2018.
 Flora of the Guianas: Corytoplectus. Retrieved 28 April 2018.

Gesnerioideae
Gesneriaceae genera